Kodom  is a village in Kasaragod district in the state of Kerala, India.

Demographics
 India census, Kodom had a population of 6451 with 3178 males and 3273 females.

Administration
This panchayath is administered as a part of the newly formed Vellarikundu taluk.

Transportation
This village is connected to Karnataka state through Panathur. There is a 20 km road from Panathur to Sullia in Karnataka from where Bangalore and Mysore can be easily accessed. Locations in Kerala can be accessed by driving towards the western side. The nearest railway station is Kanhangad railway station on Mangalore-Palakkad line. There are airports at Mangalore , Kannur International Airport[MATTANNUR] 
and. Calicut.

References

Panathur area